The 2014 OFC U-20 Championship took place between 23 and 31 May in Fiji. The squad listings were published by the OFC U-20 Championship programme.

Head coach: Rupeni Luvu

Head coach: Kamali Fitialeata

Head coach: Ravinesh Kumar

Head coach:  Wynton Rufer

Head coach: Commins Menapi

Head coach: Etienne Mermer

References

OFC U-20 Championship squads